Franz Beyer (22 April 1918 – 11 February 1944) was a German Luftwaffe fighter pilot during World War II and a recipient of the Knight's Cross of the Iron Cross of Nazi Germany. Beyer was killed on 11 February near Venlo, the Netherlands after dog-fighting with British Spitfires.  During his career he was credited with 83 aerial victories, 6 on the Western Front and 77 on the Eastern Front. On 1 June 1943, Beyer was appointed Gruppenkommandeur of IV. Gruppe of Jagdgeschwader 3.

Career
Beyer was born on 22 April 1918 in Berlin-Grunewald at the time the capital of the German Empire. On 12 July 1941, Beyer was appointed Staffelkapitän (squadron leader) of the 8. Staffel of Jagdgeschwader 3 (JG 3—3rd Fighter Wing). He replaced Oberleutnant Winfried Schmidt who had been wounded the day before. On 1 April 1943, Beyer claimed his 80th aerial victory over a Mikoyan-Gurevich MiG-3 fighter.

Group commander and death

On 31 May 1943, Beyer was transferred and command of 8. Staffel was passed on to Oberleutnant Emil Bitsch. As part of the Luftwaffe plan to expand its fighter force, a fourth Gruppe was to be added to every Geschwader. This was achieved by transferring some of the other Gruppens personnel and equipment. This created the nucleus of a newly formed Gruppe. IV. Gruppe of JG 3 was officially created on 1 June 1943 at Neubiberg Airfield and Beyer was selected as its first Gruppenkommandeur (group commander). The Gruppe was initially equipped with the Messerschmitt Bf 109 G-6, some carrying a pair of 20 mm MG 151/20 cannons installed in conformal gun pods under the wings. Beyer was not given much time to prepare his pilots for combat, already in mid-June, the Gruppe was ordered to Italy to fight in the Mediterranean theater.

On 11 July, IV. Gruppe was ordered to an airfield at Ramacca, Sicily. There, the Gruppe supported German forces defending against the Allied invasion of Sicily. Due to the advancing Allied forces, the airfield had to be abandoned on 15 July, forcing the Gruppe to retreat to Leverano. Beyer claimed his first aerial victory in this theater of operations on 19 July when he shot down a Supermarine Spitfire fighter. On 23 July, the airfield at Leverona came under a heavy attack, killing one pilot and injuring six. The ground personnel suffered 30 killed and further 31 men were wounded. In the attack, the Gruppe lost 40 Bf 109s destroyed. In consequence, the airfield was abandoned by IV. Gruppe on 26 July, relocating to San Severo Airfield. On 21 August, approximately 50 to 60 Consolidated B-24 Liberator bombers without fighter escort were intercepted by Luftwaffe fighters from IV. Gruppe of JG 3 and I. Gruppe of Jagdgeschwader 77 (JG 77—77th Bomber Wing) in the vicinity of Naples. Luftwaffe fighter pilots claimed four bombers shot down, including one by Beyer who was credited with his 82nd aerial victory.

IV. Gruppe was ordered back to Germany on 24 September where it was initially again based at Neubiberg Airfield. Over the following weeks, the Gruppe was assigned new pilots and aircraft and trained for Defense of the Reich missions. The head on attack was practiced in mock combat against Heinkel He 111 bombers from III. Gruppe of Kampfgeschwader 53 (KG 53—53rd Bomber Wing). The Gruppe flew its first combat mission against United States Army Air Forces (USAAF) on 19 December. The day the USAAF Fifteenth Air Force attacked Innsbruck and the Messerschmitt factory at Augsburg. Defending against this attack, Beyer claimed a Boeing B-17 Flying Fortress bomber shot down.

On 28 January 1944, IV. Gruppe relocated to Venlo Airfield. On 11 February, the USAAF Eighth Air Force targeted the German railroad infrastructure at Frankfurt. In parallel to this attack, a formation of Martin B-26 Marauder bombers, escorted by Spitfire fighters, attacked various targets in Belgium. IV. Gruppe intercepted this formation in the vicinity of Liège. In this encounter, IV. Gruppe claimed two aerial victories but lost Beyer. Flying Bf 109 G-6 (Werknummer 411036—factory number), he was chased by Spitfire fighters and collided with a tree south of Liège. Beyer was buried with military honors at Venlo on 17 February and later reinterred at the Ysselsteyn German war cemetery. Command of IV. Gruppe was temporarily passed to Hauptmann Heinz Lang before command was officially handed to Major Friedrich-Karl "Tutti" Müller on 26 February.

Summary of career

Aerial victory claims
According to US historian David T. Zabecki, Beyer was credited with 83 aerial victories. Spick lists Beyer with 81 aerial victories claimed in an unknown number of combat missions. This figure includes 70 aerial victories on the Eastern Front and eleven over the Western Allies. Mathews and Foreman, authors of Luftwaffe Aces — Biographies and Victory Claims, researched the German Federal Archives and found records for 84 aerial victory claims. This figure includes 78 aerial victories on the Eastern Front and six on the Western Front, including two four-engined bombers.

Victory claims were logged to a map-reference (PQ = Planquadrat), for example "PQ 3936". These sectors were then subdivided into 36 smaller units to give a location area 3 × 4 km in size.

Awards
 Iron Cross (1939) 2nd and 1st Class
 Knight's Cross of the Iron Cross on 30 August 1941 as Oberleutnant and Staffelkapitän of the 8./Jagdgeschwader 3.
 German Cross in Gold on 19 September 1942 as Oberleutnant in the 8./Jagdgeschwader 3

Notes

References

Citations

Bibliography

 
 
 
 
 
 
 
 
 
 
 
 
 
 
 
 
 

1918 births
1944 deaths
Military personnel from Berlin
People from the Province of Brandenburg
German World War II flying aces
Luftwaffe pilots
Recipients of the Knight's Cross of the Iron Cross
Recipients of the Gold German Cross
Aviators killed by being shot down
Luftwaffe personnel killed in World War II
Burials at Ysselsteyn German war cemetery